Nepharis is a genus of beetles in the family Silvanidae, containing the following species:

 Nepharis alata Laporte de Castelnau, 1869
 Nepharis costata King, 1869
 Nepharis doddi Lea
 Nepharis serraticollis Lea, 1910

References

Silvanidae